Mamadou Fofana (born 21 January 1998), also known as Nojo, is a Malian professional footballer who plays as a defender for Ligue 2 club Amiens and the Mali national team.

Club career
Fofana transferred to Alanyaspor in 2016, joining from the academy of Stade Malien. Fofana made his professional debut for Alanyaspor in a 2–3 Süper Lig loss to Çaykur Rizespor on 14 January 2017.

On 12 August 2021, he moved to Ligue 2 club Amiens and signed a five-year contract.

International career
Fofana represents Mali internationally, and represented the Mali U17s at the 2015 FIFA U-17 World Cup, and the Mali U20s at 2017 Africa U-20 Cup of Nations.

Fofana made his senior debut for the Mali national football team in a 2018 World Cup qualification tie against Ivory Coast on 6 October 2017.

Career statistics

Scores and results list Mali's goal tally first, score column indicates score after each Fofana goal.

Honours
Mali U17
FIFA U-17 World Cup  runner-up:2015

References

External links
 
 
 

1998 births
Living people
Sportspeople from Bamako
Malian footballers
Mali youth international footballers
Mali under-20 international footballers
Mali international footballers
Association football defenders
Alanyaspor footballers
Bandırmaspor footballers
FC Metz players
Amiens SC players
Süper Lig players
TFF First League players
Ligue 1 players
Ligue 2 players
Malian expatriate footballers
Malian expatriate sportspeople in Turkey
Expatriate footballers in Turkey
Malian expatriate sportspeople in France
Expatriate footballers in France
2019 Africa Cup of Nations players
2021 Africa Cup of Nations players
21st-century Malian people